The 2011 Enea Toruń FIM Speedway Grand Prix of Poland was the eighth race of the 2011 Speedway Grand Prix season. It took place on April 27 at the MotoArena Toruń stadium in Toruń, Poland.

Riders 
The Speedway Grand Prix Commission nominated Darcy Ward as Wild Card, and Piotr Pawlicki, Jr. and Emil Pulczyński both as Track Reserves. Originally, Polish Motor Union has proposed Adrian Miedziński of Unibax Toruń as a Wild Card. Ward, 2009 and 2010 Under-21 World Champion, raced for Unibax Toruń between 2009 and 2010. Injury Pole Janusz Kołodziej was replaced by first Qualified Substitutes, Magnus Zetterström. The Draw was made on August 26 at 13:00 CEST.
 (13)  Janusz Kołodziej → (19)  Magnus Zetterström

Results 
Grand Prix was won by Andreas Jonsson who beat Jarosław Hampel, wild card Darcy Ward and Antonio Lindbäck in the final.

Heat details

Heat after heat 
 (6) Hancock, Holder, Sajfutdinow, Łaguta
 (6) Zetterström, Bjerre, Ward, Pedersen
 (6) Gollob, Holta, Crump, Lindbäck
 (6) Hampel, Jonsson, Lindgren, Harris
 (6) Zetterström, Crump, Łaguta, Harris
 (6) Hampel, Gollob, Pedersen, Holder
 (6) Lindbäck, Sajfutdinow, Ward, Lindgren
 (6) Jonsson, Hancock, Holta, Bjerre
 (6) Jonsson, Lindbäck, Pedersen, Łaguta
 (6) Holder, Holta, Lindgren, Zetterström
 (6) Hampel, Bjerre, Sajfutdinow, Crump
 (6) Ward, Hancock, Gollob, Harris
 (6) Ward, Hampel, Holta, Łaguta
 (6) Lindbäck, Holder, Bjerre, Harris
 (6) Gollob, Sajfutdinow, Jonsson, Zetterström
 (6) Crump, Hancock, Pedersen, Lindgren
 (6) Lindgren, Gollob, Bjerre, Łaguta (X)
 (6) Jonsson, Ward, Crump, Holder
 (6) Pedersen, Holta, Sajfutdinow, Harris
 (6) Hancock, Lindbäck, Zetterström, Hampel 
 Semi-finals:
 (6) Ward, Jonsson, Gollob, Holta
 (6) Hampel, Lindbäck, Hancock, Zetterström
 the Final:
 (6) Jonsson (6 points), Hampel (4), Ward (2), Lindbäck (0)

The intermediate classification

References

See also 
 motorcycle speedway

Speedway Grand Prix of Poland
Poland
2011
Sport in Toruń